River Chant is an album by American jazz composer and arranger Jimmy Giuffre which was released on the Choice label in 1975.

Reception

Allmusic awarded the album 2 stars.

Track listing 
All compositions by Jimmy Giuffre
 "Tree People" - 5:53
 "Elephant" - 5:45
 "Tibetan Sun" - 4:12
 "The Train and the River" - 5:40
 "The Tide Is In" - 3:45
 "River Chant" - 4:03
 "Om" - 4:40
 "The Listening" - 4:35
 "Celebration" - 4:33

Personnel 
Jimmy Giuffre - tenor saxophone, clarinet, flute, bass flute
Kiyoshi Tokunaga - bass
Randy Kaye - percussion

References 

Jimmy Giuffre albums
1975 albums